Bennett Bluff is a bluff,  high, between the upper reaches of Venzke Glacier and Berry Glacier,  south-southwest of the Perry Range, in Marie Byrd Land. The bluff has prominent rock exposures on the north wall and was first observed and photographed from aircraft of the United States Antarctic Service on December 18, 1940. It was mapped in detail by the United States Geological Survey, 1959–65, and named by the Advisory Committee on Antarctic Names for Clarence E. Bennett, U.S. Navy, an Aviation Electronics Technician with Squadron VX-6 and a member of the McMurdo Station winter party, 1963.

References 

Cliffs of Marie Byrd Land